Marcin Drajer (born August 21, 1976 in Poznań) is a Polish footballer who plays in the position of defender. He is currently playing for Unia Janikowo. He has also played many years for Lech Poznań.

In 1993, Drajer, as a member of U-16 Poland national football team, won the U-16 European Championships

Clubs 
  Luboński KS
 1990-1997  Lech Poznań
    1998    Raków Częstochowa
    1998    Lech Poznań
    1998    Dyskobolia Grodzisk Wielkopolski
 1999-2000   Lech Poznań
   2000   TSV Havelse
 2001-2002  Lech Poznań
   2003     Polonia Warsaw
   2004     Widzew Łódź
   2004     Polonia Warsaw
 2005–present  Unia Janikowo

References 

1976 births
Living people
Polish footballers
Poland youth international footballers
Lech Poznań players
Raków Częstochowa players
Dyskobolia Grodzisk Wielkopolski players
Polonia Warsaw players
Widzew Łódź players
Unia Janikowo players
People from Luboń
Sportspeople from Greater Poland Voivodeship
Association football defenders
Polish expatriate footballers
Expatriate footballers in Germany
Polish expatriate sportspeople in Germany